Edward Ambrose Gumbs is the fifth and current bishop of the Episcopal Diocese of the Virgin Islands.

Biography
Gumbs was born on the island of Anguilla to Edward Alfonso Gumbs and Drucilla (Cynthia) Hodge. In the late 1960’s he migrated to St. Thomas, US Virgin Islands. He served in the US Navy from 1977 to 1981. After his tour of duty, he attended the College of the Virgin Islands, earning a Bachelor of Arts in Social Sciences in 1984.

After studies at Virginia Theological Seminary, he was ordained to the diaconate on June 14, 1987, and to the priesthood on June 12, 1988. His ministry as priest was primarily at St. Andrew's Episcopal Church. He was consecrated as a bishop on June 11, 2005.

He is married to Phillis Hodge and they are the parents of two daughters.

See also
List of Episcopal bishops of the United States
Historical list of the Episcopal bishops of the United States

External links
Episcopal Church website

Year of birth missing (living people)
Living people
General Theological Seminary alumni
Episcopal bishops of the Virgin Islands
Anguillan clergy
American people of Anguillan descent
United States Navy sailors
University of the Virgin Islands alumni